In the Gregorian calendar, New Year's Day is the first day of the year; 1 January. Whilst most solar calendars (like the Gregorian and Julian) begin the year regularly at or near the northern winter solstice, cultures that observe a lunisolar or lunar calendar celebrate their Lunar New Year (such as the Chinese New Year and the Islamic New Year) at less fixed points relative to the solar year.

In pre-Christian Rome under the Julian calendar, the day was dedicated to Janus, god of gateways and beginnings, for whom January is also named. From Roman times until the middle of the 18th century, the new year was celebrated at various stages and in various parts of Christian Europe on 25 December, on 1 March, on 25 March and on the movable feast of Easter.

In the present day, with most countries now using the Gregorian calendar as their civil calendar, 1 January according to that calendar is among the most celebrated public holidays in the world, often observed with fireworks at the stroke of midnight following New Year's Eve as the new year starts in each time zone. Other global New Year's Day traditions include making New Year's resolutions and calling one's friends and family.

History
The ancient Babylonian calendar was lunisolar, and around the year 2000BC began observing a spring festival and the new year during the month of Nisan, around the time of the March equinox. The early Roman calendar designated 1 March as the first day of the year. The calendar had just 10 months, beginning with March. That the new year once began with the month of March is still reflected in some of the names of the months. September through to December, the ninth through to the twelfth months of the Gregorian calendar, were originally positioned as the seventh through to the tenth months. (Septem is Latin for "seven"; octo, "eight"; novem, "nine"; and decem, "ten") Roman mythology usually credits their second king Numa with the establishment of the two new months of Ianuarius and Februarius. These were first placed at the end of the year, but at some point came to be considered the first two months instead.

The January kalend ( Ianuariae), the start of the month of January, came to be celebrated as the new year at some point after it became the day for the inaugurating new consuls in 153BC. Romans had long dated their years by these consulships, rather than sequentially, and making the kalends of January start the new year aligned this dating. Still, private and religious celebrations around the March new year continued for some time and there is no consensus on the question of the timing for 1 January's new status. Once it became the new year, however, it became a time for family gatherings and celebrations. A series of disasters, notably including the failed rebellion of M. Aemilius Lepidus in 78BC, established a superstition against allowing Rome's market days to fall on the kalends of January and the pontiffs employed intercalation to avoid its occurrence.

New Year's Day in the older Julian calendar

The Julian calendar, proposed by Julius Caesar in 46 BC, was a reform of the Roman calendar. The calendar became the predominant calendar in the Roman Empire and subsequently, most of the Western world for more than 1,600 years. The Roman calendar began the year on 1 January, and this remained the start of the year after the Julian reform. However, even after local calendars were aligned to the Julian calendar, they started the new year on different dates. The Alexandrian calendar in Egypt started on 29 August (30 August after an Alexandrian leap year). Several local provincial calendars were aligned to start on the birthday of the Emperor Augustus, 23 September. The indiction caused the Byzantine year, which used the Julian calendar, to begin on 1 September; this date is still used in the Eastern Orthodox Church for the beginning of the liturgical year.

At various times and in various places throughout mediaeval Christian Europe, the new year was celebrated on 25 December in honour of the birth of Jesus; 1 March in the old Roman style; 25 March in honour of Lady Day (the Feast of the Annunciation, the date of the conception of Jesus); and on the movable feast of Easter.

Christian observance
As a date in the Christian calendar, New Year's Day liturgically marked the Feast of the Naming and Circumcision of Jesus, which is still observed as such in the Anglican Church, the Lutheran Church, the Eastern Orthodox Church (Julian calendar, see below) and in Traditional Catholicism by those who retain the usage of the General Roman Calendar of 1960. The mainstream Roman Catholic Church celebrates on this day the Solemnity of Mary, Mother of God.

Gift giving
Among the 7th-century pagans of Flanders and the Netherlands, it was the custom to exchange gifts at the winter solstice. This custom was deplored by Saint Eligius (died 659 or 660), who warned the Flemish and Dutch: "(Do not) make visuals, [little figures of the Old Woman], little deer or iotticos or set tables [for the house-elf, compare Puck] at night or exchange New Year gifts or supply superfluous drinks [another Yule custom]." However, on the date that European Christians celebrated the Feast of the Circumcision, they exchanged Christmas presents because the feast fell within the 12 days of the Christmas season in the Western Christian liturgical calendar; The custom of exchanging Christmas gifts in a Christian context is traced back to the Biblical Magi who gave gifts to the Christ Child. In Tudor England, 1 January (as the Feast of the Circumcision, not New Year's Day), along with Christmas Day and Twelfth Night, was celebrated as one of three main festivities among the twelve days of Christmastide.

Acceptance of 1 January as New Year’s Day
Most nations of Europe and their colonies officially adopted 1 January as New Year's Day somewhat before they adopted the Gregorian calendar. France changed to 1 January from 1564, most of Germany did so from 1544, the Netherlands from 1556 or 1573 according to sect, Italy (not being united) did so on a variety of dates, Spain and Portugal from 1556, Sweden, Norway and Denmark from 1599, Scotland from 1600, and Russia from 1725. England, Wales, Ireland, and Britain's American colonies did so from 1752.

Great Britain and the British Empire
Until 1752 (except Scotland), the Kingdom of Great Britain and its Empire at the time had retained 25 March as the official start of the year (though informal use of 1 January had become common.) With the Calendar (New Style) Act 1750, Britain and the Empire formally adopted 1 January as New Year's Day and, with the same Act, also discarded the Julian calendar (though the actions are otherwise unrelated). The Act came into effect "following the last said day of December 1751".

By 1750, an eleven-day difference between the older Julian and the newer and more accurate Gregorian calendars also needed to be adjusted for. There was some religious dissent regarding feast days being moved, especially Christmas Day (see Old Christmas), and isolated communities continued the old reckoning to a greater or lesser extent. The years 1800 and 1900 were leap years in the Julian calendar but not in the Gregorian, so the difference increased to twelve then thirteen days. The year 2000 was a leap year in both calendars.
In the Gwaun Valley in Wales, the new year is celebrated on 13 January, still based on the 19th century difference in the calendars.
Foula, in the Shetland islands celebrates Yule ('Old Christmas' rather than the December solstice) on 6 January and Newerday on 13 January. Again, both dates reflect the nineteenth century reckoning and were not moved again in 1900.

Eastern Orthodoxy
At various stages during the first half of the twentieth century, all countries in Eastern Christendom adopted the Gregorian calendar as their civil calendar but continued, and have continued into modern times, to use the Julian Calendar for ecclesiastical purposes. As 1 January (Julian) equates to 14 January (Gregorian), a religious celebration of the New Year on this date may seem strange to Western eyes.

New Year's Days in other calendars

In cultures that traditionally or currently use calendars other than the Gregorian, New Year's Day is often also an important celebration. Some countries concurrently use Gregorian and another calendar. New Year's Day in the alternative calendar attracts alternative celebrations of that new year:

African
Nayrouz and Enkutatash are the New Year's Days of the Coptic Egyptians and the Ethiopians, respectively. Between 1900 and 2100, both occur on 11 September in most years and on 12 September in the years before Gregorian leap years. They preserve the legacy of the ancient Egyptian new year Wept Renpet, which originally marked the onset of the Nile flood but which wandered through the seasons until the introduction of leap years to the traditional calendar by Augustus in 30-20BC. In Ethiopia, the new year is held to mark the end of the summer rainy season.
The Odunde Festival is also called the African New Year is celebrated in Philadelphia, Pennsylvania in the United States on the second Sunday of June. While the name was based on the Yoruba African culture, its celebration marks the largest African celebration in the world, which more or less was started by a local tradition.
The Sotho people of Lesotho and South Africa celebrate Selemo sa Basotho on 1 August during the end of the Southern Hemisphere's winter. This is based on the Sotho calendar, and includes observances such as "Mokete wa lewa", a celebration that follows the harvest.

East Asian
Chinese New Year is celebrated in some countries around East Asia, including China, and South-east Asia, including Singapore. It is the first day of the traditional Chinese calendar, a lunar calendar that is corrected for the solar changes every three years (i.e. a lunisolar calendar). The holiday normally falls between 20 January and 20 February. The holiday is celebrated with food, families, lucky money (usually in a red envelope), and many other red things for good luck. Lion and dragon dances, drums, fireworks, firecrackers, and other types of entertainment fill the streets on this day. 1 January is also a legal holiday in China, and people also celebrate the Gregorian New Year in this day, but it is not as grand as the traditional Chinese New Year.
Japanese New Year is celebrated on 1 January because the Gregorian calendar is now used instead of the Chinese calendar in use until 1873.
Korean New Year is celebrated on the first day of the traditional Korean calendar in South Korea. The first day of this lunisolar calendar, called Seollal, is an important national holiday (along with Chuseok), with a minimum of three days off of work and school. Koreans celebrate New Year's Day by preparing food for their ancestors' spirits, visiting ancestors' graves, and playing Korean games such as yunnori with families. Young children show respect to their parents, grandparents, relatives, and other elders by bowing down in a traditional way and are given good wishes and some money by the elders.
In addition, South Koreans celebrate the 1 January New Year's Day of the Gregorian Calendar, and as a national holiday, people have the day off. The Gregorian calendar is now the official civil calendar in South Korea, so the populace now considers the 1 January New Year's Day the first day of the year. South Koreans calculate their age using the East Asian age reckoning method, with all South Koreans adding a year to their age at midnight of the New Year (of the Gregorian, not the Korean calendar). Families enjoy the New Year by counting down to midnight on New Year's Eve on 31 December.
North Koreans celebrate the New Year's Day holiday on the first day of the Gregorian calendar, 1 January. This New Year's Day, confusingly also called Seollal, is a big holiday in North Korea, while they take a day off on the first day of the Korean calendar. The first day of the Korean calendar is regarded as a day for relaxation, but North Koreans consider the first day of the Gregorian calendar to be even more important.

Southeast Asian

Cambodian New Year (Chaul Chnam Thmey) is celebrated on 13 April or 14 April. There are three days for the Khmer New Year: the first day is called "Moha Songkran", the second is called "Virak Wanabat" and the final day is called "Virak Loeurng Sak". During these periods, Cambodians often go to the pagoda or play traditional games. Phnom Penh is usually quiet during Khmer New Year as most Cambodians prefer spending it at their respective hometowns.
Thai New Year is celebrated on 13 April or 14 April and is called Songkran in the local language. People usually come out to splash water on one another. The throwing of water originated as a blessing. By capturing the water after it had been poured over the Buddhas for cleansing, this "blessed" water is gently poured on the shoulder of elders and family for good fortune.
Thingyan, Burmese new year's celebrations, typically begin on 13 April but the actual New Year's Day falls on 17 April in the 21st century. The day has slowly drifted over the centuries. In the 20th century, the day fell on 15 or 16 April while in the 17th century, it fell on 9 or 10 April.
Vietnamese New Year (Tết Nguyên Đán or Tết), more commonly known by its shortened name Tết or "Vietnamese Lunar New Year", is the most important and popular holiday and festival in Vietnam, the holiday normally falls between 20 January and 20 February. It is the Vietnamese New Year marking the arrival of spring based on the Chinese calendar, a lunisolar calendar. The name Tết Nguyên Đán is Sino-Vietnamese for Feast of the First Morning, derived from the Hán nôm characters 節 元 旦.

South Asian
Diwali related New Year's celebrations include Marwari new year and Gujarati new year.
Indian New Year's days has several variations depending on the region and is based on the Hindu calendar.
Hindu In Hinduism, different regional cultures celebrate the new year at different times of the year. In Assam, Bengal, Kerala, Nepal, Odisha, Punjab, Telangana, Andra Pradesh, and Tamil Nadu households celebrate the new year when the Sun enters Aries on the Hindu calendar. This is normally on 14 April or 15 April, depending on the leap year. Elsewhere in northern/central India, the Vikram Samvat calendar is followed. According to that, the new year day is the first day of the Chaitra Month, also known as Chaitra Shukla Pratipada or Gudi Padwa. This is basically the first month of the Hindu calendar, the first Shukla paksha (fortnight) and the first day. This normally comes around 23–24 March, mostly around the Spring Equinox in Gregorian Calendar. The new year is celebrated by paying respect to elders in the family and by seeking their blessings. They also exchange tokens of good wishes for a healthy and prosperous year ahead.
Malayalam New Year (Puthuvarsham) is celebrated either on the first day of the month of Medam in mid-April which is known as Vishu, or the first day of the month of Chingam, in the Malayalam Calendar in mid-August according to another reckoning. Unlike most other calendar systems in India, the New Year's Day on the Malayalam Calendar is not based on any astronomical event. It is just the first day of the first of the 12 months on the Malayalam Calendar. The Malayalam Calendar (called Kollavarsham) originated in 825 AD, based on general agreement among scholars, with the re-opening of the city of Kollam (on Malabar Coast), which had been destroyed by a natural disaster.
Nepal Sambat is the Nepalese New Year celebration.
Pahela Baishakh or Bangla Nabobarsho is the first day of the Bengali Calendar. It is celebrated on 14 April as a national holiday in Bangladesh, and on 14 or 15 April in the Indian states of West Bengal, Tripura, and part of Assam by people of Bengali heritage, irrespective of their religious faith.
The Sikh New Year is celebrated as per the Nanakshahi calendar. The epoch of this calendar is the birth of the first Sikh Guru, Guru Nanak in 1469. New Year's Day falls annually on what is 14 March in the Gregorian Western calendar.
Sinhalese New Year is celebrated in Sri Lankan culture predominantly by the Sri Lankan Sinhalese, while the Tamil New Year on the same day is celebrated by Sri Lankan Tamils. The Sinhalese New Year (aluth avurudda), marks the end of the harvest season, by the month of Bak (April) between 13 and 14 April. There is an astrologically generated time gap between the passing year and the New Year, which is based on the passing of the sun from the Meena Rashiya (House of Pisces) to the Mesha Rashiya (House of Aries) in the celestial sphere. The astrological time difference between the New Year and the passing year (nonagathe) is celebrated with several Buddhist rituals and customs that are to be concentrated on, which are exclusive of all types of 'work'. After Buddhist rituals and traditions are attended to, Sinhala and Tamil New Year-based social gatherings and festive parties with the aid of firecrackers, and fireworks would be organized. The exchange of gifts, cleanliness, the lighting of the oil lamp, making kiribath (milk rice), and even the Asian Koel are significant aspects of the Sinhalese New Year.
Tamil New Year (Puthandu) is celebrated on 13 April or 14 April. Traditionally, it is celebrated as Chiththirai Thirunaal in parts of Tamil Nadu to mark the event of the Sun entering Aries. Panchangam (almanac), is read in temples to mark the start of the Year.
Telugu New Year (Ugadi), Kannada New Year (Yugadi) is celebrated in March (generally), April (occasionally). Traditionally, it is celebrated as Chaitram Chaitra Shuddha Padyami in parts of Andhra Pradesh, Telangana, and Karnataka to mark the event of New Year's Day for the people of the Deccan region of India. It falls on a different day every year because the Hindu calendar is a lunisolar calendar. The Saka calendar begins with the month of Chaitra (March–April) and Ugadi/Yugadi marks the first day of the new year. Chaitra is the first month in Panchanga which is the Indian calendar. Panchangam (almanac), is read in temples to mark the start of the Year.

Middle Eastern
The major religions  of the Middle East are Islam and Judaism: their adherents worldwide celebrate the first day of their respective new religious calendar years.

Islam
The two primary sects of Islam are Sunni Islam and Shia Islam. They have different calendars though for both the epoch of the calendar is the Hijrah.
Islamic New Year (or "Hijri New Year")) is the day celebrated in Sunni Islamic culture that marks the beginning of a new year in the Lunar Hijri calendar. It disregards the solar year: its New Year's Day is on a different Gregorian date each year because it is a lunar calendar, making it on average 11 to 12 days shorter than a solar year. The first day of the year is observed on the first day of Muharram, the first month in this calendar.
Nowruz marks the first day of spring and the beginning of the year in the Solar Hijri calendar (one of the Iranian calendars). It is celebrated on the day of the astronomical Northern spring equinox, which usually occurs on or about 20 March (Gregorian calendar). Nowruz has been celebrated for over 3,000 years by the cultural continent of Iran, including Kurdistan and Afghanistan. The holiday is also celebrated and observed by many parts of Central Asia, South Asia, Northwestern China, Crimea and some groups in the Balkans. As well as being a Zoroastrian holiday and having significance amongst the Zoroastrian ancestors of modern Iranians, the same time is celebrated in the Indian sub-continent as the new year. The moment the Sun crosses the celestial equator and equalizes night and day is calculated exactly every year and Iranian families gather together to observe the rituals.

Judaism
Rosh Hashanah (the Jewish New Year), is celebrated by Jews in Israel and throughout the world. The date is the new moon of Tishrei, which is the seventh month counting from Nisan, the first month of Spring. It always falls during September or October. The holiday is celebrated by blasting of shofar trumpets, to signify it as a day of judgment, by prayers of penitence, by readings from the law and prophets, and by special meals. The night of 31 December/1 January, the New Year according to the Gregorian calendar, is also celebrated widely in Israel and is referred to as Sylvester or the civil new year.

Martian

According to a convention established by NASA, the Martian year begins on its Northward equinox, the spring equinox of its northern hemisphere. Its most recent New Year's Day (of MY37) coincided with 26 December 2022 on Earth's Gregorian calendar. New Year's Day of MY38 will coincide with 12 November 2024.

Traditional and modern celebrations and customs

New Year's Eve

The first of January represents the fresh start of a new year after a period of remembrance of the passing year, including on radio, television, and in newspapers, which starts in early December in countries around the world. Publications have year-end articles that review the changes during the previous year. In some cases, publications may set their entire year's work alight in the hope that the smoke emitted from the flame brings new life to the company. There are also articles on planned or expected changes in the coming year.

This day is traditionally a religious feast, but since the 1900s has also become an occasion to celebrate the night of 31 December—New Year's Eve—with parties, public celebrations (often involving fireworks shows) and other traditions focused on the impending arrival of midnight and the new year. Watchnight services are also still observed by many.

New Year's Day

The celebrations and activities held worldwide on 1 January as part of New Year's Day commonly include the following:
Several major parades are held on New Year's Day, including the London's New Year's Day Parade, Pasadena's Tournament of Roses Parade (also known as the "Rose Parade"), and Philadelphia's Mummers Parade. In the Bahamas, it is also associated with Junkanoos.
Beginning in the 2010s, it is also the day that First Day Hikes takes place in the fifty state park systems of the United States.
The Vienna Philharmonic orchestra traditionally performs a New Year's concert on the morning of New Year's Day.
A "polar bear plunge" is a common tradition in some countries, where participants gather on beaches and run into the cold water. Polar Bear Clubs in many Northern Hemisphere cities have a tradition of holding organized plunges on New Year's Day, and they are often held to raise money for charity.
In Ireland, New Year's Day was called Lá na gCeapairí, or the day of the buttered bread. A possible meaning to the consumption of buttered bread was to ward off hunger and famine in the coming year, by placing the buttered bread on the doorstep in the morning. Some traditions saw parties of young people calling from house to house to receive buttered bread and occasionally Poitín, or to give out buttered bread in exchange for pennies. This tradition has since died out, having been popular in the 19th century, and waning in the 1930s and 1940s.
In Japan, Korea and areas inhabited by the Inuit, Yupik, Aleut, Chukchi and the Iñupiat, watching the first sunrise is a tradition.
In the United Kingdom and United States, New Year's Day is associated with several prominent sporting events:
In the United States, 1 January is the traditional date for several major post-season college football bowl games, including the Citrus Bowl in Orlando, the Outback Bowl in Tampa, the Rose Bowl Game in Pasadena, and the Sugar Bowl in New Orleans. Since 2015, the Rose and Sugar Bowl games host the semi-finals of the College Football Playoff every three seasons. Since 2008, the National Hockey League has hosted an annual outdoor game, the Winter Classic, which rotates between different host teams annually, and usually showcases a major regional rivalry. If New Year's Day falls on a Sunday, sporting events and associated festivities (such as the Rose Parade) traditionally held on New Year's Day are typically deferred to the following Monday in defense of the National Football League—which plays a Sunday gameday as normal.
The Premier League in English football traditionally holds a fixture of matches on New Year's Day, stemming from the historic tradition of games being played over the Christmas holiday period (including, just as prominently, Boxing Day).
The final of the PDC World Darts Championship typically falls on New Year's Day.
The Cheltenham Racecourse holds a New Year's Day fixture, which includes the Fairlawne Handicap Chase, Dipper Novices' Chase, and Relkeel Hurdle.
New Year's Day is a government and bank holiday in many countries.

Music
Music associated with New Year's Day comes in both classical and popular genres, and there is also Christmas song focus on the arrival of a new year during the Christmas and holiday season.
Paul Gerhardt wrote the text for a hymn for the turn of the year, "Nun lasst uns gehn und treten", first published in 1653.
Johann Sebastian Bach, in the Orgelbüchlein, composed three chorale preludes for the new year: Helft mir Gotts Güte preisen ["Help me to praise God's goodness"] (BWV 613); Das alte Jahr vergangen ist ["The old year has passed"] (BWV 614); and In dir ist freude ["In you is joy"] (BWV 615).
The year is gone, beyond recall is a traditional Christian hymn to give thanks for the new year, dating back to 1713.
In English-speaking countries, it is traditional to sing Auld Lang Syne at midnight on New Year's.

New Year's Day babies
A common image used, often as an editorial cartoon, is that of an incarnation of Father Time (or the "Old Year") wearing a sash across his chest with the previous year printed on it passing on his duties to the Baby New Year (or the "New Year"), an infant wearing a sash with the new year printed on it.

Babies born on New Year's Day are commonly called New Year babies. Hospitals, such as the Dyersburg Regional Medical Center in the US, give out prizes to the first baby born in that hospital in the new year. These prizes are often donated by local businesses. Prizes may include various baby-related items such as baby formula, baby blankets, diapers, and gift certificates to stores which specialise in baby-related merchandise.

Antarctica
On New Year's Day in Antarctica, the stake marking the geographic south pole is moved approximately 10 meters to compensate for the movement of the ice. A new marker stake is designed and made each year by staff at the site nearby.

Other celebrations on 1 January
The Eastern Orthodox Church, the Anglican Church and the Lutheran Church celebrate the Feast of the Circumcision of Christ on 1 January, based on the belief that if Jesus was born on 25 December, then according to Hebrew tradition, his circumcision would have taken place on the eighth day of his life (1 January). The Roman Catholic Church celebrates on this day the Solemnity of Mary, Mother of God, which is also a Holy Day of Obligation.

Johann Sebastian Bach composed several church cantatas for the double occasion:
Singet dem Herrn ein neues Lied, BWV 190, 1 January 1724
Jesu, nun sei gepreiset, BWV 41, 1 January 1725
Herr Gott, dich loben wir, BWV 16, 1 January 1726
Gott, wie dein Name, so ist auch dein Ruhm, BWV 171, 1 January 1729(?)
Fallt mit Danken, fallt mit Loben, 1 January 1735 (Christmas Oratorio Part IV)

See also
First Night
List of films set around New Year
List of winter festivals
Rosh Hashanah
Saint Sylvester's Day
New Year's Six

Notes

References

Bibliography
. 
. &

External links

New Year's Around the World – slideshow by Life magazine

 
Day
Annual events
January observances
Holidays
Public holidays in Algeria
Public holidays in Australia
Public holidays in Azerbaijan
Public holidays in Cambodia
Public holidays in Canada
Public holidays in Denmark
Public holidays in Indonesia
Public holidays in Kazakhstan
Public holidays in Malaysia
Public holidays in New Zealand
Norwegian flag flying days
Public holidays in Norway
Public holidays in Singapore
Swedish flag flying days
Public holidays in Sweden
Public holidays in Thailand
Public holidays in Turkey
Public holidays in the United Kingdom
United States flag flying days
Public holidays in the United States
Public holidays in the Republic of Ireland
Public holidays in Ukraine
Federal holidays in the United States
Public holidays in Vietnam